Michael Heffernan may refer to:

 Michael Heffernan (politician) (1885–1970), Irish politician
 Michael Heffernan (hurler) (born 1989), Irish hurler
 Michael Heffernan (academic) (born 1959), historical geographer
 Mike Heffernan, Australian rules footballer